The Orleans Firebirds, formerly the Orleans Cardinals, are a collegiate summer baseball team based in Orleans, Massachusetts. The team is a member of the Cape Cod Baseball League (CCBL) and plays in the league's East Division. The Firebirds play their home games at Eldredge Park in Orleans, which opened in 1913 and is the CCBL's oldest ballpark. The Firebirds are owned and operated by the non-profit Orleans Athletic Association. 

Orleans has won two CCBL championships in the 21st century, most recently in 2005 when they defeated the Bourne Braves two games to one to win the best of three championship series. The team was a dominant force in the CCBL during the 11-season span from 1947 to 1957 in which Orleans claimed seven league titles. The team has been led since 2005 by field manager Kelly Nicholson.

History

Pre-modern era

Early years

Baseball in Orleans has been played at Eldredge Park since 1913, when the land for the park was donated to the town by baseball enthusiast Louis Winslow "Win" Eldredge, "in consideration of [his] affection for and interest in the young people of Orleans and [his] desire to provide a playground for them."

The early Cape League era (1923–1939)

In 1923 the Cape Cod Baseball League was formed and included four teams: Falmouth, Chatham, Osterville, and Hyannis. This early Cape League operated through the 1939 season and disbanded in 1940, due in large part to the difficulty of securing ongoing funding during the Great Depression. Orleans' entry into the league came in 1928. Wareham had been added in 1927 to bring the number of teams to five, and Orleans and Plymouth were to be added in 1928, though the Plymouth entry never materialized.

Orleans featured several notable figures during this era. Lynn, Massachusetts native John "Blondy" Ryan played for Orleans in 1928 and went on to play for the World Series-winning 1933 New York Giants. New Hampshire native Red Rolfe played for Orleans in 1930 and went on to be the starting third-baseman for the New York Yankees of the late 1930s. Rolfe was a four-time American League all-star, and won five World Series titles with the Bronx Bombers. While at Orleans, Rolfe played for skipper Patsy Donovan, a longtime major league player and manager who had managed the Boston Red Sox in 1910 and 1911, and who piloted the Orleans team in 1929 and 1930. Al Weston and Ed Wineapple played for Orleans in 1931. Weston was a former Boston College star who had played with the major league Boston Braves in 1929, and Wineapple a 1929 Washington Senator who had played for Osterville in the CCBL for three years previously. Lawrence, Massachusetts native Johnny Broaca played for Orleans from 1930 to 1932, and later pitched for the 1936 World Series champion Yankees.

Orleans withdrew from the league after the 1934 season due to funding issues, but returned in 1937. Massachusetts Governor Charles F. Hurley was on hand to throw out the ceremonial first pitch to open the 1937 season in Orleans as the team faced Harwich. Orleans fielded a team again in 1938, but then was forced to withdraw from the league again for the 1939 season, after which the league itself disbanded.

Orleans' 1938 team featured Danvers, Massachusetts native Connie Creeden, who batted over .400 for the season to lead the league, and who went on to play for the major league Boston Braves. The team's ace pitcher in 1938 was Somerville, Massachusetts native Al Blanche. Blanche was a Cape League veteran who had led Harwich's 1933 title club, then spent two seasons in the majors with the Boston Braves before returning to the Cape League in 1938 to play for Orleans. CCBL Hall of Famer Bill Enos played for Orleans during this period, and went on to be a longtime scout for the Boston Red Sox, as well as the first-ever scouting liaison for the Cape League to Major League Baseball.

The Upper and Lower Cape League era (1946–1962)

The Cape League reorganized in 1946 after a hiatus during World War II, and Orleans began play in the revived league in 1947. The team was originally known as the Orleans Sparklers, but soon became known as the Orleans Red Sox. Orleans dominated the post-war period, appearing in the CCBL championship series in each of its first nine years in the league, and 11 times total between 1947 and 1959. During this span, the club won seven CCBL titles, including back to back championships in 1949 and 1950, and again in 1952 and 1953.

The club was skippered by Herb Fuller in 1947 and 1948, and featured CCBL Hall of Famers Roy Bruninghaus, a Cape League all-star pitcher for three decades for Orleans who had been playing with the team since the 1930s, and Allen "Buzzy" Wilcox, another three-decade player, who was an infielder for Orleans for 17 years from the 1940s to the 1960s. Orleans won the league title in its inaugural 1947 campaign, defeating the Upper Cape champion Mashpee Warriors in that year's championship series, which was played as a Labor Day home-and-home doubleheader. In Game 1 at Eldredge Park, Orleans got an 11-strikeout performance by Bruninghaus, and slugger Dave Bremner went 5-for-5 with a homer in the 12–7 win. Facing Mashpee's CCBL Hall of Fame ace hurler Donald Hicks in Game 2, Bremner continued his torrid pace, going 4-for-6, but Orleans trailed by two going to the final frame. In the top of the ninth, Orleans exploded for seven runs, then brought in Bruninghaus to close out the 15–10 win and clinch the club's first Cape League crown. Fuller brought the club back to the title series in 1948 for a rematch with Mashpee, but this time Hicks and Mashpee came out on top. 

In 1949, CCBL Hall of Famer Laurin "Pete" Peterson joined the team as catcher/manager and piloted the club for the next 14 years. Peterson's 1949 club finished atop the Lower Cape division and went on to meet Upper Cape champ Falmouth in the best-of-five title series. Orleans took the first two games, winning Game 1 at home, 4–2, then capitalizing on nine Falmouth errors while riding a complete game by Roy Bruninghaus and a 4-for-4 day by Dave Bremner to a 6–2 Game 2 win at Falmouth Heights. After Game 2, Orleans lost the services of stars Bruninghaus and Bremner, who were unavailable for the remainder of the series, and the result was a Game 3 drubbing at Eldredge Park as Falmouth stayed alive by an 11–5 tally. Game 4 was marred by controversy and charges of poor sportsmanship as Orleans brought in Stan Wilcox, who had not played for the club all season, and who had played professionally earlier in the year. Falmouth's defense was again riddled with errors, and Orleans walked away with a 6–1 series-clinching victory.

Orleans was back in the title series in 1950, this time facing Upper Cape champ Sagamore in what became the first of five consecutive championship matchups between the perennial Upper and Lower Cape powerhouses. Orleans seemed ready to sweep the Clouters, taking Game 1, 8–3, and Game 2, 19–9, with Roy Bruninghaus going the distance on the mound for the win in both contests. Sagamore hurler Ricky Anderson almost single-handedly turned the series around as he twirled complete games in both halves of a Labor Day doubleheader, beating Orleans 8–5 in the morning Game 3 at Orleans, and 10–6 in the afternoon Game 4 at Keith Field, and helping his own cause with a 4-for-8 day at the plate. The deciding Game 5 was played at the neutral Ezra Baker Field in Dennis, and Orleans left no doubt, riding back-to-back homers by Buzzy Wilcox and Bob Bremner in the fourth, and a complete game six-hit shutout by Bruninghaus to a championship-clinching 8–0 victory.

Peterson's club was downed by Sagamore in the 1951 CCBL championship, but was back on top the following season. In the 1952 best-of-five Cape League championship series, Orleans swept the Clouters, with pitchers Bruninghaus and Bill McCrae allowing Sagamore only two runs in the series. Orleans took Games 1 and 2 by tallies of 5–1 and 3–1, then sealed the deal with a title-clinching 3–0 Labor Day shutout at Eldredge Park. 

Orleans repeated as champions in 1953, again sweeping Sagamore in three straight for the title. In Game 1 at Keith Field, Orleans sent Bruninghaus to the mound and gave him ample support, including a three-run homer by Jim Gage in a 13–5 rout. Game 2 at home was another Orleans romp, as hurler Bill McCrae tossed a three-hitter in a 12–1 win. Orleans was down on the road, 6–5, in the eighth inning of Game 3, when Peterson brought in Bruninghaus to relieve starter John Linnell. Bruninghaus escaped the jam, and proceeded to tie the game himself with a homer in the top of the ninth. He went on to no-hit Sagamore for three more innings, while Orleans put the game away with a four-run 11th, capped by Junie Lee's three-run bomb, to take a 10–6 win that completed the repeat championship sweep.

In the teams' fifth consecutive championship series meeting, Orleans bowed to Sagamore in the 1954 title tilt, but Peterson's boys were back to face a new opponent the following season. After playoff series wins over North Truro AFS and Yarmouth to claim the Lower Cape title, Orleans advanced to the 1955 championship round against the Cotuit Kettleers. The series' first two games were played as a home-and-home double header, and in Game 1 at Lowell Park, Orleans bats were on a tear and hurler John Mayo struck out ten in a complete game effort, as Orleans took the series lead with an 11–3 win. In Game 2 at home, Orleans lefty Ray Tucker tossed a four-hitter as the club scratched out a 4–2 victory to take a commanding series lead. Orleans completed the sweep on the road as Tucker posted his second win of the series, fanning 13 Cotuit batters before Roy Bruninghaus relieved him with one out in the ninth, to nail down a 6–3 Orleans win that clinched the title.

For the first time since joining the revived league, Orleans failed to reach the CCBL title series in 1956, but the club was right back in championship form the following season. The 1957 Orleans club was pitted against Upper Cape champ Wareham in the league title series. The Red Sox sent Doug Higgins to the mound in Game 1 and jumped ahead early with four runs in the first and never looked back, routing the Gatemen by a final of 10–1. Orleans completed the two-game sweep before a home crowd in Game 2, getting a homer and a pair of singles from Stan Wilcox on the way to a 5–3 victory that secured the club's seventh CCBL crown in 11 years. 

CCBL Hall of Famer Art Quirk posted a remarkable 9–0 record in 1958 with a 1.12 earned run average as a pitcher for Orleans, while also leading the league with a .475 batting average. Quirk went on to play in the majors for the Baltimore Orioles and Washington Senators. In 1959, Orleans reached the CCBL title series for a final time during this era, facing old nemesis Sagamore in a matchup of the two dominant clubs of the period. The Clouters proceeded to shut down Orleans, evening the score at three titles apiece over the adversaries' six title matchups in the decade.

Modern era (1963–present)

In 1963, the CCBL was reorganized and became officially sanctioned by the NCAA. The league would no longer be characterized by "town teams" who fielded mainly Cape Cod residents, but would now be a formal collegiate league. Teams began to recruit college players and coaches from an increasingly wide geographic radius. 

The league was originally composed of ten teams, which were divided into Upper Cape and Lower Cape divisions. The Orleans team was dubbed the Orleans Cardinals, and joined Harwich, Chatham, Yarmouth and a team from Otis Air Force Base in the Lower Cape Division.

The 1960s and 1970s

Orleans was skippered in the 1960s by Dave Gavitt, an Orleans pitcher in the late 1950s and later the CEO of the Boston Celtics and member of the Naismith Memorial Basketball Hall of Fame. Gavitt brought Orleans to the league championship series in the 1963 inaugural year of the modern era, but the team fell short against Cotuit. CCBL Hall of Famer Lou Lamoriello played for Orleans in 1963, as did fellow CCBL Hall of Famer Tom Yankus, a three-year league all-star who threw a no-hitter for Orleans on July 4, 1965. Yankus later managed Orleans from 1974 to 1980. The 1965 season also saw CCBL Hall of Famer John Awdycki lead the league with a .407 batting average.

In 1966, University of New Hampshire star Calvin Fisk played first base for Orleans. Near the end of the season, Calvin's younger brother Carlton Fisk joined him in Orleans, and proceeded to belt a homer in his first at-bat for the Cardinals. Though the younger Fisk played in only a handful of games for the Cardinals, he made a lasting impression. Carlton was drafted in 1967 by the hometown Boston Red Sox, where he was a perennial all-star throughout the 1970s In 2000, he was inducted into the National Baseball Hall of Fame in Cooperstown, New York.

In 1967, the CCBL All-Star Game was held at Eldredge Park, and the Cardinals' own Chuck Seelbach emerged as the winning pitcher. Seelbach also tossed a no-hitter that season at Eldredge Park against a Chatham team that featured future major league star Thurman Munson. The 1968 Orleans team featured CCBL Hall of Famer Phil Corddry, who went 9–2 with 108 strikeouts in 92 innings for the Cardinals to win the league's Outstanding Pitcher Award. Another future CCBL Hall of Famer, Jim Norris, batted .415 for the Cardinals in 1969, and claimed the league MVP Award. Norris returned in 1970 to bat .333 with 19 stolen bases, but surrendered his league batting crown to teammate Mike Eden, who led all hitters with a .378 mark. Holy Cross hurler Mike Pazik tossed a no-hitter for Orleans against Harwich in 1971, allowing his only base runner via hit batsman. CCBL Hall of Fame first baseman Brad Linden led the Cards in 1971 and 1972. Linden was a league all-star in 1972, batting .372 with a league-leading 10 homers.
 
Orleans failed to capture a league title in the 1960s and 1970s, but reached the league championship series four times, including back to back losses in 1970 and 1971 against a powerful Falmouth team that was in the process of completing a string of four consecutive league titles. The 1974 Cardinals advanced to the title series, but were downed in the ninth inning of a decisive Game 5 by Cotuit. The 1975 and 1976 Cardinals featured Boston College baseball and hockey star Tom Songin, who went on to play for the Boston Bruins. Orleans' Chuck Dale was the league's Outstanding Pitcher in 1978.

The 1980s and a first modern-era championship

In 1980 and 1981 the Cardinals featured shortstop Wade Rowdon, the league's Outstanding Pro Prospect Award winner in 1981, he was also the MVP of the CCBL All-Star Game at Fenway Park, a game that ended in a 4–4 tie. Rowdon tied a league record with three homers in a single game against Wareham, and led the 1981 team to the playoffs where they bounced Harwich in the semi-finals, but were downed by Cotuit in the league championship series. The 1985 season was highlighted by Cardinal hurler Bob O'Brien's no-hitter against Cotuit in which he came short of a perfect game by just two walks and benefited from outfielder Glenn Fernandez's home run-robbing catch at the fence of a smash by Kettleers' slugger Greg Vaughn.

The Cardinals won their first league championship of the modern era in 1986. The team featured slugger Gary Alexander, who hit .313 with 12 home runs, and ace hurlers and future major leaguers Jeff Conine and Mike Ignasiak. Led by manager John Castleberry, the Cards boasted the league's best record in the regular season, and met Chatham in the playoff semi-finals. In Game 1 at Eldredge Park, the Cardinals got a three-run clout from Bert Heffernan, and Ignasiak twirled a complete game to best the A's, 6–4. Game 2 at Veterans Field went to extra innings tied at 2–2. Chatham's ace, CCBL Hall of Famer Mark Petkovsek, dominated Cardinal hitters, allowing only two hits through ten frames. In the 11th, Petkovsek gave up a lead-off single to Alexander, and was left in the game to face Kevin Garner, who popped one just over the right field fence for the series-winning walk-off score.

The 1986 championship series pitted the Cardinals against two-time defending champion Cotuit. In Game 1 at home, Orleans gave starter Conine plenty to work with. The Cards exploded for four home runs, three of them by Alexander alone, and one by Garner off the bandstand in center field, in a 9–4 win. Ignasiak spun another gem in Game 2 at Lowell Park, going the distance and holding the Kettleers to just two hits and no runs. The Cards got a homer from Alexander in the first, his fourth long ball of the title series. Todd Haney added the insurance with a two-run blast in the seventh to give Orleans the 3–0 win and title series sweep, with Alexander taking home playoff MVP honors for his brilliant power display.

In 1988, Orleans reached the championship series again, powered by CCBL Hall of Fame slugger Frank Thomas, who was said to have hit the longest ball ever out of Eldredge Park, and who hit three home runs in one game at Wareham. The team lost in the finals to Wareham, but Thomas went on to a stellar career with the Chicago White Sox and was inducted into the National Baseball Hall of Fame in 2014. Eldredge Park hosted the CCBL All-Star Game in three consecutive seasons from 1988 to 1990. The 1988 event featured the league's inaugural All-Star Game Home Run Derby, won by the Cards' mighty Frank Thomas. The host team claimed the derby crown each of the three years, with Mike Thomas matching Thomas' feat in 1989, and Mike Gropusso doing the same in 1990.

A second title marks the 1990s

Orleans won another Cape League title in 1993 with a team led by skipper Rolando Casanova and starring future Boston Red Sox all-star and Cape League Hall of Famer Nomar Garciaparra, who hit .321 with 50 hits and 17 stolen bases for the Cards. The team also included future major leaguers Aaron Boone and Jay Payton. In the playoffs, the Cardinals met Chatham in a dramatic three-game semi-final series. In Game 1 at Veterans Field, Orleans hurler Chris Ciaccio went the distance in a pitchers' duel that was knotted at 1–1 going into the ninth. Payton clubbed the game-winning homer in the final frame to give the Cards the 2–1 victory. The A's answered in Game 2, shutting out the Cards, 4–0, at Eldredge Park. Orleans got the last laugh however, dominating the Game 3 finale at Chatham, taking the decisive game by a 7–1 tally. In the championship series, the Cards faced a strong Wareham team, and took Game 1 at Clem Spillane Field by a 2–1 margin on a first-inning two-run homer by Aaron Boone. In Game 2 at Eldredge Park, Ciaccio sparkled again, allowing only four hits. Catcher Steve Fishman snuck a two-run homer down the line in the sixth, and the Cards walked away with a 5–1 win to sweep the series and claim the crown, with Ciaccio taking home playoff MVP honors.

The Cardinals' 1994 team starred league Outstanding Pro Prospect Award winner Dave Shepard and future major league all-star Todd Helton, who carried on a Cards tradition by winning the All-Star Game Home Run Derby at Eldredge Park. 

The 1999 Orleans team featured two future CCBL Hall of Famers in pitcher Ben Sheets and league MVP Lance Niekro, as well as future major leaguer Mark Teixeira, who was named the league's Outstanding Pro Prospect. Sheets, who was an all-star the previous season with Wareham, posted a 1.10 ERA in 16.1 innings for Orleans in 1999. Niekro batted .360 and clobbered 13 home runs on the season, and also recorded a save on the mound as the Cardinals and Wareham Gatemen set the record for the longest game in modern-era CCBL history with an 18-inning, 5 hour, 14 minute affair in Wareham. Four years later, Eldredge Park saw that record broken, as the 2003 Cardinals were downed in 20 innings by Harwich after 5 hours and 52 minutes.

The 2000s bring a pair of championships and the advent of the Firebirds

The 2001 Cardinals featured second baseman Russ Adams, the league's Outstanding Pro Prospect who became a first-round pick in the following year's MLB draft. In 2002, Orleans was led by the league's Outstanding Pitcher Award winner Brian Rogers, who posted a microscopic 0.40 ERA for the season, and all-star catcher Ryan Hanigan, an Andover, Massachusetts native who was named the league's Outstanding New England Player. The team finished atop the East Division with an impressive 29–13–2 record, and prevailed over Y-D in the playoff semi-finals, but was shut down by Wareham in the title series.

Manager Carmen Carcone brought the Cards back to the title series for a second consecutive season in 2003, the team powered by playoff MVP and CCBL home run derby champion Cesar Nicolas. After taking the semi-final series from Brewster, the Cardinals faced Bourne in the championship series. Game 1 was a low-scoring extra-innings affair at Eldredge Park. After Bourne went ahead, 1–0, in the third, the Cards tied it in the fourth on a deep Nicolas dinger to left, his third homer of the playoffs. The teams remained even at 1–1 going into the bottom of the tenth, when the home team loaded the bases and won it on Myron Leslie's walk-off RBI single. Game 2 at Bourne was another tight one, with Game 1 winner Ryan Schroyer coming on in relief to get the final six outs, five of them by strikeout, to nail down the 5–4 Orleans victory and complete the series sweep.

Skipper Kelly Nicholson took the Cards' helm in 2005, led the team to a first-place finish in the East Division, and was honored as the league's manager of the year. Nicholson's Cardinals featured CCBL Outstanding Relief Pitcher Steven Wright, and Emmanuel Burriss, who led the league with 37 stolen bases. After taking the semi-final playoff series from Chatham by winning both ends of a day-night playoff doubleheader, Orleans once again met Bourne for the title. Game 1 at Eldredge Park was scoreless going into the bottom of the ninth when the speedy Burriss scored the game's only run in dramatic walk-off fashion by tagging up on a foul pop. The Braves proceeded to clobber the Cards in Game 2 at Bourne by a score of 10–1. Orleans answered early in Game 3, scoring nine runs in the first three innings. The Cards shut down Bourne hitters behind the stellar pitching of Brad Meyers and closer Wright, and cruised to a 13–1 title-clinching victory. Meyers shared playoff MVP honors with Burriss, who reached base five times and scored three runs in the finale.

In 2006, Nicholson's team starred future CCBL Hall of Famer and Outstanding Pro Prospect Award winner Matt Wieters. A league all-star catcher, Wieters batted .307 with eight home runs, including a colossal shot off the right-centerfield bandstand at Eldredge Park.

The 2009 season saw the team change its nickname, following an agreement between the Cape League and Major League Baseball which stated that if a CCBL team shared a nickname with an MLB team, the team would have to obtain its uniforms through a Major League Baseball Properties-licensed vendor. Wanting to maintain its independence and longstanding relationship with local vendors, the Orleans team opted to change its moniker to the Orleans Firebirds.

The 2010s

Throughout the 2010s, the team continued to be skippered by Kelly Nicholson, who surpassed Laurin "Pete" Peterson as the longest-tenured manager in team history. The team qualified for the playoffs in nine of ten years in the decade, winning East Division titles in 2011, 2015 and 2017, and reaching the championship series in 2013 before falling to Cotuit. Eastham, Massachusetts native Sue Horton, the team's general manager since 2000, received the league's Dick Sullivan Executive of the Year Award in 2016.

Notable players of the decade included CCBL Hall of Famer Kolten Wong, who hit .341 with 22 stolen bases to claim the league MVP Award in 2010. CCBL Hall of Famer Marcus Stroman played for the Firebirds in 2010 and 2011, allowing zero earned runs over 34 career innings pitched, and Trevor Gott was the league's Outstanding Relief Pitcher for Orleans in 2011. The Firebirds boasted the league's Outstanding Pitcher Award winners in back-to-back seasons with Kolton Mahoney in 2014, and Mitchell Jordan, who tied a CCBL modern era single season record with a 0.21 ERA in 2015. 

Firebirds Stephen Scott and Carter Aldrete won back-to-back All-Star Game Home Run Derby crowns in 2017 and 2018, and center fielder Jimmy Herron was MVP of the 2017 All-Star Game for his game-winning RBI in the East Division's 5–3 win. The 2018 Firebirds featured league Outstanding Pro Prospect J.J. Bleday, a CCBL all-star outfielder who hit .311 with five home runs, and hurlers Mitchell Senger and Aaron Ochsenbein, who tossed a combined no-hitter against Brewster. New Bedford, Massachusetts native Jared Shuster was the league's Outstanding New England Player in 2019. A league all-star, Shuster posted a 4–0 record with a 1.40 ERA in 30 innings, striking out 35 while walking only five.

The 2020s
The 2020 CCBL season was cancelled due to the coronavirus pandemic. 2021 Firebird Chase DeLauter tied for tops in the CCBL with nine home runs and claimed the league's Outstanding Pro Prospect award. In 2022, the trio of Orleans moundsmen Bryce Warrecker, Josh Allen and Chris Clark combined to no-hit Chatham, with starter Warrecker, the league's Outstanding Pitcher award winner, tossing six perfect innings.

CCBL Hall of Fame inductees

The CCBL Hall of Fame and Museum is a history museum and hall of fame honoring past players, coaches, and others who have made outstanding contributions to the CCBL. Below are the inductees who spent all or part of their time in the Cape League with Orleans.

Notable alumni

 Cory Abbott 2016
 Riley Adams 2016
 Russ Adams 2001
 Jon Adkins 1996
 Greg Allen 2013
 Andrew Aplin 2011
 Harry Arlanson 1929–1930
 Scott Baker 2002
 Jeff Ballard 1984
 Mike Ballard 2005
 Brian Bark 1988–1989
 Brian Barnes 1988
 Tres Barrera 2015
 Brian Barton 2004
 Kevin Bearse 1984
 Brandon Bielak 2016
 Al Blanche 1938
 J. J. Bleday 2018
 Justin Blood 2000
 Brandon Boggs 2002–2003
 Aaron Boone 1993
 Brad Boxberger 2007
 Matthew Boyd 2011–2012
 Andrew Brackman 2006
 Bill Bray 2003
 John Brebbia 2010–2011
 Johnny Broaca 1930–1932
 Gary Brown 2008–2009
 Jordan Brown 2004
 Ryan Budde 1999
 Corbin Burnes 2015
 Emmanuel Burriss 2005
 Drew Butera 2004
 Alex Call 2015
 Jonathan Cannon 2021
 Ryan Carpenter 2010–2011
 Brett Cecil 2006
 Andrew Chafin 2011
 Travis Chapman 1998
 Nick Christiani 2007
 Vince Conde 2013
 Jeff Conine 1986
 Dylan Covey 2012
 Brandon Crawford 2007
 Connie Creeden 1938
 Kyle Crockett 2012
 Jake Cronenworth 2014
 Colin Curtis 2004–2005
 Chase d'Arnaud 2007
 Bobby Dalbec 2014–2015
 Ronnie Dawson 2015
 Chase DeLauter 2021
 Jason Dellaero 1996
 Lance Dickson 1989
 Brian Dorsett 1981
 Tommy Doyle 2015
 Matt Duffy 2011
 Angel Echevarria 1990
 Mike Eden 1970–1971
 Brian Edgerly 1964
 Frederick M. Ellis 1928–1929
 Brian Esposito 1999
 Cole Figueroa 2008
 Carlton Fisk 1966
 David Fletcher 2014
 Nate Freiman 2007–2008
 John Gall 1997
 Mike Gambino 1998
 Nomar Garciaparra 1993
 Dave Gavitt 1958
 Logan Gilbert 2017
 Wayne Gomes 1992
 Romy González 2017
 Mike Gosling 1999
 Trevor Gott 2011
 Tyler Greene 2004
 Tommy Gregg 1983
 Sean Guenther 2016
 Glenn Gulliver 1975
 Chip Hale 1984–85
 Todd Haney 1986
 Eric Hanhold 2014
 Ryan Hanigan 2002
 Bob Hansen 1969
 Erik Hanson 1984
 Jeff Hartsock 1987
 Adam Haseley 2016
 Alex Hassan 2008–2009
 Mike Hauschild 2011
 Bert Heffernan 1986
 Todd Helton 1994
 Xavier Hernandez 1985
 Matt Howard 1988
 Tim Hummel 1999
 Mike Humphreys 1987
 Scott Hurst 2016
 Mike Ignasiak 1986–1987
 Jason Jaramillo 2003
 Jonathan Johnson 1995
 Hunter Jones 2005
 Jace Jung 2021
 Tommy Kahnle 2009
 Dominic Keegan 2019
 Trevor Kelley 2013
 Mike Kelly 1990
 Jeff Keppinger 2000–2001
 Joe Kerrigan 1972
 Andrew Kittredge 2010
 Kevin Kramer 2013
 Roger LaFrancois 1975–1976
 Lou Lamoriello 1963
 Greg LaRocca 1993
 Bill Laskey 1977
 Eric Lauer 2015
 Jack Leathersich 2010–2011
 Jesse Levis 1987–1988
 Kyle Lewis 2015
 Tyler Locklear 2021
 Zach Logue 2016
 Mickey Lopez 1994
 Rick Luecken 1982
 Jordan Luplow 2013
 Daniel Lynch 2017
 Joe Mahoney 2006
 Mike Marjama 2011
 Mike Martin Jr. 1994
 Dave Maurer 1996
 Ben McDonald 1989
 Jared McKenzie 2021
 Zach McKinstry 2016
 Trevor Megill 2014
 Jason Michaels 1996
 Mike Milchin 1987
 Brian Miller 2016
 Chad Moeller 1995
 Gabe Molina 1995
 Willie Morales 1991
 Eli Morgan 2016
 Russ Morman 1982
 Danny Muno 2009
 Sean Murphy 2015
 Mark Newman 1969
 Lance Niekro 1999–2000
 Stephen Nogosek 2015
 Lars Nootbaar 2017
 Jim Norris 1969–1970
 Mike Olt 2008–2009
 Pat Osburn 1968
 Dave Otto 1983–1984
 Jay Payton 1992–1993
 Mike Pazik 1970–1971
 Dave Pember 1998
 Ryan Perry 2007
 Chris Pettit 2005
 Philip Pfeifer 2012
 Brett Pill 2005
 Daniel Pinero 2015
 Bobby Poyner 2013–2014
 Rich Poythress 2008
 Scott Proctor 1996
 David Purcey 2003
 Pat Putnam 1973
 Art Quirk 1958
 Dan Radison 1971
 Rob Rasmussen 2008–2009
 Jorge Reyes 2009
 Bryan Reynolds 2015
 Antoan Richardson 2004
 J. T. Riddle 2012
 Brad Rigby 1992
 Edwin Ríos 2014
 Brian Rogers 2002
 Mike Rogodzinski 1969
 Red Rolfe 1930
 Ryan Rolison 2017
 Wade Rowdon 1980–1981
 Blondy Ryan 1928
 Joe Ryan 2015–2016
 Chris Sabo 1982
 Nelson Santovenia 1980
 Josh Satin 2006
 Josh Sborz 2013–2014
 Michael Schwimer 2007
 Chuck Seelbach 1967
 Steve Selsky 2009–2011
 Scott Servais 1986
 Ben Sheets 1999
 Jared Shuster 2019
 Jeff Smith 1993–1995
 Mike Smithson 1975
 J.T. Snow 1988
 Noah Song 2018
 Tom Songin 1975–1976
 Bennett Sousa 2015
 Pete Stanicek 1984
 Rob Stanifer 1993
 Brock Stassi 2009
 Spencer Steer 2018
 Christin Stewart 2014
 Graeme Stinson 2017–2018
 Marcus Stroman 2010–2011
 Marc Sullivan 1977
 Eric Surkamp 2006–2007
 Travis Tartamella 2007–2008
 Everett Teaford 2005
 Mark Teixeira 1999
 Charles Thomas 1999
 Frank Thomas 1988
 David Thompson 2014
 Trent Thornton 2014
 Matt Torra 2004
 Andy Tracy 1994
 Chad Tracy 2000
 Mike Trujillo 1981
 Preston Tucker 2010
 Tanner Tully 2015
 Brock Ungricht 2005
 Danny Valencia 2006
 Elih Villanueva 2006
 Taylor Ward 2014
 Mike Welch 1993
 Al Weston 1931
 Jason Wheeler 2011
 Tim Wheeler 2008
 Sean White 2001
 Karsten Whitson 2012
 Matt Wieters 2006
 Cole Wilcox 2019
 Adam Wilk 2008
 Trevor Williams 2012
 Brooks Wilson 2016–2017
 Ed Wineapple 1931
 Kolten Wong 2010
 Steven Wright 2005
 Kelly Wunsch 1992
 Logan Wyatt 2018
 Daniel Zamora 2013

Yearly results

Results by season, 1928–1938

* During the CCBL's 1923–1939 era, postseason playoffs were a rarity. In most years, the regular season pennant winner was simply crowned as the league champion.However, there were four years in which the league split its regular season and crowned separate champions for the first (A) and second (B) halves. In two of thoseseasons (1936 and 1939), a single team won both halves and was declared overall champion. In the other two split seasons (1933 and 1935), a postseasonplayoff series was contested between the two half-season champions to determine the overall champion.

Results by season, 1947–1962

* Regular seasons split into first and second halves are designated as (A) and (B).

Results by season, 1963–present

League award winners

(*) - Indicates co-recipient

All-Star Game selections

Italics - Indicates All-Star Game Home Run Hitting Contest participant (1988 to present)

No-hit games

Managerial history

(*) - Season count excludes 2020 CCBL season cancelled due to coronavirus pandemic.

Broadcasters
The Firebirds were one of the first teams in the Cape Cod Baseball League to have student broadcast interns. 
 Andrew Gothelf (Northwestern University) 2007–08
 Tristan Hobbes (Eastern Connecticut State University) 2010
 Craig Durham (University of Colorado, Boulder) 2010
 Kevin Fitzgerald (Syracuse University) 2012–13
 Sam Levitt (Northwestern University) 2012–13
 David Fine (Syracuse University) 2014
 Sean Hooley (Boston College) 2014
 Nate Gatter (University of Missouri) 2015
 Ryan Bafaloukos (Arizona State University) 2015
 Logan Ratick (Syracuse University) 2016
 Brendan King (Butler University) 2016
 Tyler Aki (Syracuse University) 2017
 Noah Johnson (University of Maryland, College Park) 2017
 Braiden Bell (Arizona State University) 2018
 Josh White (University of Miami) 2018–19
 Thomas Zinzarella (Providence College) 2019
 Jacob Kronberg (Syracuse University) 2020
 Brandon Ross (Syracuse University) 2020
 Carlo Jiménez (University of Southern California) 2021
 Gareth Kwok (Arizona State University) 2021
 Jack Johnson (Arizona State University) 2022
 Luke Moehle (University of Missouri) 2022

See also
 Orleans Firebirds players

References

External links

Rosters

 2000
 2001
 2002
 2003
 2004
 2005
 2006
 2007
 2008
 2009
 2010
 2011
 2012
 2013
 2014
 2015
 2016
 2017
 2018
 2019
 2021
 2022

Other links
Orleans Firebirds official site
CCBL Home Page
Orleans Firebirds MLB Alumni

Cape Cod Baseball League teams
Amateur baseball teams in Massachusetts
Orleans, Massachusetts